Jan Olsson may refer to:
Jan Olsson (footballer, born 1944), Swedish footballer who played in the 1970 FIFA World Cup
Jan Olsson (footballer, born 1942), Swedish footballer who played in the 1974 FIFA World Cup
Jan Ohlsson (born 1962), Swedish former child actor, known for his role as Emil in Emil i Lönneberga
Jan Olsson (film scholar) (born 1952), Swedish film scholar